Saint Ursicinus of Ravenna (d. ca. 67) is venerated as a martyr by the Catholic Church.  He was said to be a physician of Ravenna.  His legend is connected with that of Saint Vitalis, who is said to have encouraged the wavering Ursicinus after the physician was sentenced to death for his faith. After he was beheaded, Vitalis buried him in Ravenna.

He should not be confused with Bishop Ursicinus of Ravenna (6th century), who ordered the Basilica of Sant'Apollinare in Classe to be built.

References

External links
Saints of June 19: Ursicinus

Year of birth missing
1st-century deaths
Italian saints
1st-century Christian martyrs